Equity Bank Rwanda Limited (EBRL), is a commercial bank in Rwanda. The bank is licensed by the National Bank of Rwanda, the central bank and national banking regulator.

Overview
EBRL is a medium-sized financial services provider in Rwanda, with an estimated total asset valuation of about US$363.39 million (RWF:366.39 billion), as of 31 March 2021. The shareholders' equity was US$52.42 million (RWF: 52.86 billion).

History
The bank was granted a banking license by the National Bank of Rwanda, in 2011 and commenced banking services in the fourth quarter of 2011. Rwanda was the fourth East African country where the Equity Bank Group has opened a subsidiary. Operations in Tanzania commenced during the first quarter of 2012. The bank group maintains financial services subsidiaries in Kenya, Rwanda, South Sudan, Democratic Republic of Congo Uganda and Tanzania. Operations in Burundi are planned to begin in the next five years.

According to the New Times Rwanda, Equity Bank Rwanda received the Bank of the Year-Rwanda 2020 award by The Banker during the Bank of the Year Awards.

In 2020 the bank rebranded to Equity Rwanda as it diversified into insurance, it began by being an insurance brokerage firm.

Ownership
Equity Bank Rwanda Limited is a 100% subsidiary of the  Equity Group Holdings Limited. Headquartered in Nairobi, Kenya, Equity Group Holdings Limited is the largest financial services provider in East Africa. , Equity Group Holdings' asset base was valued at over US$3.83 billion (KES:339.44 billion), with shareholders' equity in excess of US$10.2 billion (KES:1.12 Trillion).
At this time, the group's customer base was estimated at over 14 million in the five East African countries that it serves, making it the largest commercial bank on the African continent, by customer numbers.

Branch Network
Equity Bank Rwanda Limited maintains the following branches, as of December 2014.

Equity Group Holdings Limited
The companies that compose the Equity Group Holdings Limitedinclude but are not limited to the following:

 Equity Bank Kenya Limited – Nairobi, Kenya  – 100% Shareholding – A commercial bank in Kenya, serving individuals and businesses.
 Equity Bank Rwanda Limited – Kigali, Rwanda  – 100% Shareholding – A commercial bank in Rwanda, serving both individuals and businesses.
 Equity Bank South Sudan Limited – Juba, South Sudan  – 100% Shareholding – A commercial bank in South Sudan.
 Equity Bank Tanzania Limited – Dar es Salaam, Tanzania  – 100% Shareholding – A commercial bank in Tanzania.
 Equity Bank Uganda Limited – Kampala, Uganda  – 100% Shareholding – A commercial bank in Uganda. 
 Equity BCDC – Kinshasa, Democratic Republic of the Congo : 77.5 percent Shareholding – A commercial bank in DR Congo.
 Equity Consulting Group Limited – Nairobi, Kenya 
 Equity Insurance Agency Limited – Nairobi, Kenya  – 100% Shareholding – The insurance agency arm of the group. Offering bancassurance services to customers
 Equity Nominees Limited – Nairobi, Kenya  – 100% Shareholding – A Nominee company. Holding investments on behalf of customers.
 Equity Investment Bank Limited – Nairobi, Kenya  – 100% Shareholding – An investment bank in Kenya. A member of the Nairobi Securities Exchange and licensed by the Capital Markets Authority.
 Finserve Africa Limited – Nairobi, Kenya  – 100% Shareholding – A mobile virtual network operator (MVNO) in the Kenya.
 Equity Group Foundation – Nairobi, Kenya  – 100% Shareholding – The philanthropy and corporate social responsibility arm of the group.
 Azenia - Nairobi, Kenya—100% Shareholding – A technological affiliate for developing digital solutions to the group.

The stock of Equity Group Holdings Limited is traded on the Nairobi Stock Exchange, under the symbol: EQTY. On Thursday 18 June 2009, the Group's stock cross listed on the Uganda Securities Exchange (USE), and started trading that day, under the symbol: EBL. Equity Bank Rwanda started trading at the Rwanda Stock Exchange in 2015 under the symbol EQTY.

See also
 List of banks in Rwanda
 Equity Bank Group
 Economy of Rwanda

References

External links
 Website of Equity Bank Rwanda Limited
 Equity Bank in Massive Rwanda Expansion

Banks of Rwanda
Banks established in 2011
2011 establishments in Rwanda
Organisations based in Kigali
Economy of Kigali